Ramdaspally is a village in Ranga Reddy district in Telangana, India. The Village comes under Ibrahimpatnam mandal.
Ramdaspalli village  is two kilometers away from the Nagarjun Sagar Road (State Highway 19) and 14 km from NH9. Most of the villagers are farmers.

References

Villages in Ranga Reddy district